Stephanie Nonoshita Topalian (born August 5, 1987), known simply as , is an American singer and actress of Armenian and Japanese descent who is signed with SME Records Japan, which is a part of Sony Music. She released two albums: her self-titled debut in 2008 and Colors of my Voice in 2009. She has won the Japanese Music Awards in 2007. A number of her songs have been featured in several Japanese films. She had roles in a few Japanese films, notably Pride and Tokyo Tribe. In 2015, she represented Armenia in the Eurovision Song Contest 2015 as a member of Armenian super group project Genealogy with the song "Face the Shadow".

Early life and education
She was born to a Japanese mother and an Armenian father in Los Angeles, California. Although she is residing in Japan, she has a strong commitment to her Armenian background and is very attached to her grandparents. Her paternal grandmother Koharik Mikaelian Topalian was born in Lebanon and her paternal grandfather Jean Pierre Topalian was born in France, both of Armenian descent.

Stephanie graduated from Aoyama Gakuin University Law School. She is bilingual and speaks English and Japanese.

Career
She began singing at a young age. At age 13, she moved to Japan with her family. At 14, Stephanie sent an audio demo tape of her singing to various music productions, and received a response from a Japanese music producer Joe Rinoie. Rinoie was impressed with her singing, and at the age of 19 Stephanie made her major debut in Japan from SME Records (Sony). She achieved the "Best New Artist Award" at the prestigious 49th Japan Record Awards in 2007 and afterwards released two albums.

Her debut single "Kimiga Iru Kagiri" and the follow-up single "Because of You" became the ending themes of the anime Kiss Dum. Her fifth single, “Changin", was also featured as the last ending theme of the anime D.Gray-man. In early 2008, her single "Friends" became the second ending theme for the anime Gundam 00. The song appeared in the Top 10 of Japanese Oricon charts.

As an actress Stephanie debuted  in the film Pride in 2009, based on Yukari Ichijo's shōjo comic. She portrayed the protagonist Shio Asami and took part in the film's theme song, "Pride ~A Part of Me~" that featured SRM. Aside from Pride, Stephanie also starred in 2009 in the short film It's All Good which was fully scripted in English.  She was cast in 2014 to be in Tokyo Tribe and a short film.

Eurovision

In February 2015 she was announced as a member of the music group Genealogy (made up of singers from Armenia and the Armenian diaspora) that represented Armenia in the Eurovision Song Contest 2015. Stephanie Topalian represents the Asian continent in the formation whereas the Ethiopian Vahe Tilbian represents Africa, the American Tamar Kaprelian the American continent, the French Essaï Altounian the European continent, Australian Mary-Jean O'Doherty Basmadjian Oceania and Inga Arshakyan Armenia. The group sang "Face the Shadow" at the contest in Vienna, Austria. She then became an Armenian citizen along with the other members of Genealogy on 28 April 2015 after being given Armenian passports by President Serzh Sargsyan.

Discography

Studio albums

Singles

As a lead artist

As a featured artist

Promotional singles

Guest appearances

Notes

References

Further reading

Stephanie- Armenian Pulse Radio & Entertainment
Stephanie Topalian (ステファニー)

External links
 archive

1987 births
Living people
Singers from Tokyo
21st-century Armenian women singers
American emigrants to Japan
American people of Armenian descent
American musicians of Japanese descent
Armenian pop singers
Citizens of Armenia through descent
Aoyama Gakuin University alumni
Japanese women pop singers
Japanese-language singers
Singers from Los Angeles
Sony Music Entertainment Japan artists
21st-century American women singers
21st-century American singers
Anime musicians
Singers with a five-octave vocal range
Japanese people of Armenian descent
21st-century Japanese women singers
21st-century Japanese singers
21st-century American actresses
21st-century Japanese actresses
Armenian people of Japanese descent
Genealogy (band) members
American women musicians of Japanese descent